Bellechasse was an electoral district of the Legislative Assembly of the Parliament of the Province of Canada, in Canada East. It was created by the Union Act, 1840 in 1841, based on the previous electoral district of the same name for the Legislative Assembly of Lower Canada. It was located in the current Chaudière-Appalaches area.

Bellechasse was represented by one Member at the Legislative Assembly of the Province of Canada. It was abolished in 1867, upon the creation of Canada and the province of Quebec.

Boundaries 

The Union Act, 1840 merged the two provinces of Upper Canada and Lower Canada into the Province of Canada, with a single Parliament.  The separate parliaments of Lower Canada and Upper Canada were abolished.

The Union Act provided that the pre-existing electoral boundaries of Lower Canada and Upper Canada would continue to be used in the new Parliament, unless altered by the Union Act itself. The Bellechasse electoral district of Lower Canada was not altered by the Act, and therefore continued with the same boundaries which had been set by a statute of Lower Canada in 1829:

The electoral district of Bellechasse thus included the County of Bellechasse (now part of the Bellechasse Regional County Municipality), and some adjacent areas. The elections were held at Saint Vallier and Saint Gervais.

Members of the Legislative Assembly 

Bellechasse was represented by one member in the Legislative Assembly.

The following were the members for Bellechasse.

 Augustin-Norbert Morin (1844–1852)
 Jean Chabot (1852–1854)
 Octave-Cyrille Fortier (1854–1861)
 Édouard Rémillard (1861–1867)

Abolition 

The district was abolished on July 1, 1867, when the British North America Act, 1867 came into force, splitting the Province of Canada into Quebec and Ontario.  It was succeeded by electoral districts of the same name in the House of Commons of Canada and the Legislative Assembly of Quebec.

See also
History of Canada
History of Quebec
Politics of Canada
Politics of Quebec

References 

Electoral districts of Canada East